The 1980–81 Algerian Cup is the 19th edition of the Algerian Cup. EP Sétif are the defending champions, having beaten USK Alger 1–0 in the previous season's final.

Round of 64

Round of 32

Round of 16

Quarter-finals

Semi-finals

Final

Match

References

Algerian Cup
Algerian Cup
Algerian Cup